Jefferson Hack (born 1971 in Montevideo, Uruguay) is a Curator, Creative Director and co-founder of Dazed Media, an independent media company that produces stories across its print, digital and video brands. The company's portfolio includes fashion bi-annuals Another Magazine and Another Man; bi-monthly youth fashion and culture magazine Dazed, and websites Anothermag.com, Dazeddigital.com, Dazedbeauty.com and Anothermanmag.com in addition to the creative wing Dazed Studio. Hack, who previously served as Editor of these titles, is also co-founder of global video channel Nowness.

Early life and career
Hack was born in Montevideo, Uruguay and lived for much of his childhood and teenage years in Cliffsend, Kent.

In 1991, at the age of 19, Hack founded Dazed with photographer Rankin while a student at London College of Printing. In 2001 Hack launched luxury bi-annual Another Magazine. In 2005 Hack co-founded men's style bi-annual Another Man.

In 2006 Hack launched dazeddigital.com, in 2009 he launched anothermag.com, and in 2017 he launched anothermanmag.com.

In 2010 Hack co-founded Nowness, an independent luxury lifestyle video channel in partnership with LVMH Moët Hennessy Louis Vuitton. In 2017 Dazed Media and Modern Media formed a joint venture titled Modern Dazed and acquired a majority stake in Nowness.

In 2013, Hack launched Dazed Studio, the creative agency wing of Dazed Media, which makes digital, video, print, events and social media for brands, Dazed & Confused was rebranded as Dazed in spring 2014.

Hack has worked with Björk and as creative consultant to U2. In 2015 he worked with Rihanna on a project with Alexander McQueen and Another Magazine that resulted in the world's first digital cover magazine and in 2015 with fashion designer Karl Lagerfeld which resulted in the world's first handcrafted hologram fashion magazine cover.

Personal life
Hack was in a relationship with model Kate Moss in the early 2000s. Together they have a daughter, Lila Grace Moss-Hack born in 2002. He lives in East London.

Books
Star Culture, The “Dazed and Confused” Collected Interviews. By Mark Sanders and Hack. Phaidon Press, 2000. .
RankinWorks. By Kate Moss, Oliviero Toscani, Liz Farrelly, and Hack. Booth-Clibborn, 2002. .
Another Fashion Book. By Hack. Steidl, 2009. .
Another Art Book. By Hack. Steidl, 2011. .
Dazed and Confused: Making It Up As We Go Along. By Ingrid Sischy and Hack, Rankin and Jo-Ann Furniss. Rizzoli, 2012. .
Kate: The Kate Moss Book. By Kate Moss, Fabien Baron, Jess Hallett, and Hack. Rizzoli, 2012. .
Another Man: Men's Style Stories. By Alister Mackie, Hack, Ben Cobb. Rizzoli, 2014. .
We Can’t Do this Alone: Jefferson Hack the System  By Hack. Rizzoli, 2016. .

References

External links
Evening Standard: Still Dazed After All These Years

1971 births
Living people
People from Montevideo
British journalists